Gary Bullock (July 19, 1941 – April 11, 2022) was an American actor and author.

Career 
Bullock appeared in such films as RoboCop 2, Twin Peaks: Fire Walk with Me, RoboCop 3, Species and Racing Stripes and appeared on such television series as In the Heat of the Night, Roseanne, NYPD Blue, Star Trek: Voyager, The X-Files and Star Trek: Enterprise. He was married to actress Mil Nicholson and wrote a romantic science-fiction novel titled Elsewhen.

Personal life 
Bullock died on April 11, 2022, at the age of 80.

Filmography

Film

Television

References

External links 

1941 births
2022 deaths
American male television actors